Pure Dance was a UK radio station specialising in dance music. It broadcast on digital satellite television, and by Internet, in Windows Media, RealPlayer and mp3PRO.

Typical music included trance, hardcore, old skool, and the very latest straight from the clubs. The channel began falling silent for long periods of time in January 2006, with its website and webstreams going offline. It was removed from the Sky EPG in March 2006 after having not transmitted any audio for over two weeks.

Presenters
Warren Street, Dan Wood, Matt Forest, Ryan Morrison, Ben & Nixxi, Stu Allan, Billy 'Daniel' Bunter, Slipmatt, Lisa Lashes, Angelli & Nelson, Warp Brothers

References

Defunct radio stations in the United Kingdom
Dance radio stations